John Gourlay (1879 – unknown) was a Scottish footballer who played as a defender. Born in Kirkendbright, he played for Annbank and Manchester United.

External links
Profile at MUFCinfo.com

1879 births
Scottish footballers
Manchester United F.C. players
Year of death missing
Association football defenders